is a railway station on the Hokuriku Main Line in the city of Awara, Fukui Prefecture, Japan, operated by the West Japan Railway Company (JR West).

Lines

Station layout
The station consists of one unnamed island platform connected by a level crossing. The station is unattended.

Platforms

History
The station opened on 15 April 1921. With the privatization of Japanese National Railways (JNR) on 1 April 1987, the station came under the control of JR West.

Passenger statistics
In fiscal 2016, the station was used by an average of 18 passengers daily (boarding passengers only).

Surrounding area
Hokuriku Expressway

See also
 List of railway stations in Japan

References

External links

  

Railway stations in Fukui Prefecture
Stations of West Japan Railway Company
Railway stations in Japan opened in 1921
Hokuriku Main Line
Awara, Fukui